The 2018–19 Divizia A is the 61st season of the Romanian women's handball second league. A total of 27 teams contested the league, being divided in four series, Seria A (6 teams), Seria B (8 teams), Seria C (7 teams) and Seria D (6 teams). At the end of the season the first two places from each series will qualify for the Divizia A promotion play-off.

Team changes

To Divizia A
Relegated from Liga Națională
 HCM Slobozia
 Rapid București

From Divizia A
Promoted to Liga Națională
 Gloria Buzău
 Minaur Baia Mare

Excluded teams
 Corona II Brașov
 CSS Tulcea
 KSE Târgu Secuiesc
 Mureșul Târgu Mureș
 SCM Timișoara

Other teams
 Olimpic Târgu Mureș merged with the new formed CSM Târgu Mureș.
 Dunărea Brăila and Minaur Baia Mare enrolled their second teams Dunărea II and Minaur II.
 LPS Târgu Jiu was enrolled in the league.

Teams

Seria A

Seria B

Seria C

Seria D

League tables

Seria A

Seria B

Seria C

Seria D

Promotion play-offs

Semi-final tournament
The first two eligible teams from each series of the regular season will compete in two main group which will be played in a neutral venue. The first two ranked teams from each group of the semi-final tournament will qualify for the Final Four. The semi-final tournament was played on neutral ground, in Făgăraș.

Group 1

Group 2

Final Four
The Final Four was played on neutral ground, in Ploiești.

League table – positions 1–4

Promotion/relegation play-offs
The 3rd and 4th-placed teams of the Divizia A promotion tournament faced the 11th and 12th-placed teams of the Liga Națională. The first two places promoted to Liga Națională and the last two relegated to Divizia A. The play-offs were played on neutral ground, in Cisnădie.

References

External links
 Romanian Handball Federaration 

Divizia A (women's handball)
Div
Div
2018–19 domestic handball leagues